Oshta is a rural locality (a selo) in Megorskoye Rural Settlement, Vytegorsky District, Vologda Oblast, Russia. The population was 1,204 as of 2002. There are 19 streets.

Geography 
Oshta is located 64 km southwest of Vytegra (the district's administrative centre) by road. Tarasino is the nearest rural locality. Malgora, the highest point of the Vepsian Upland, rises to the east of Oshta.

References 

Rural localities in Vytegorsky District
Lodeynopolsky Uyezd